"One by One" is a song by Kitty Wells and Red Foley that was released in 1954 on the Decca label (catalog no. 29065-B). It was written by Johnny Wright, Jack Anglin, and Jim Anglin.  In May 1954, it peaked at No. 1 on the Billboard country and western chart. It was also ranked as the No. 2 record on the Billboard 1954 year-end country and western retail and juke box charts.

See also
 Billboard Top Country & Western Records of 1954

References

Kitty Wells songs
Red Foley songs
1954 songs